Gianfrancesco is a given name. Notable people with the name include:

 Gianfrancesco Guarnieri (1934–2006), Italian–Brazilian actor, lyricist, poet, and playwright
 Gianfrancesco Penni (1488/1496–1528), Italian painter
 Gian Francesco Poggio Bracciolini (1380–1459), Italian scholar

See also
 
 
 Gianfranco

Italian masculine given names